Téofilo Torres Corzo (born 9 August 1946) is a Mexican politician affiliated with the PRI. He currently serves as Senator of the LXII Legislature of the Mexican Congress representing San Luis Potosí. He also served as Deputy between 1985 until 1988.

References

1946 births
Living people
Governors of San Luis Potosí
Members of the Senate of the Republic (Mexico)
Members of the Chamber of Deputies (Mexico)
Presidents of the Senate of the Republic (Mexico)
Institutional Revolutionary Party politicians
20th-century Mexican politicians
21st-century Mexican politicians
Politicians from San Luis Potosí
People from San Luis Potosí City
Members of the Congress of San Luis Potosí
Universidad Autónoma de San Luis Potosí alumni
Senators of the LXII and LXIII Legislatures of Mexico